Johann Martin Veith (9 May 165014 April 1717) was a Swiss painter in the Baroque style, known for historical, Biblical and mythological scenes.

Life and work
Johann Martin Veith studied art in Rome and Venice for ten years, after which he went with the Prince Radziwiłł to Warsaw, where he worked for two years. Upon his return to Schaffhausen he painted portraits of prominent people as well as scenes from mythology and history in the Venetian style.

External links
 
 
 Johann Kaspar Fuessli: , Bd. 2, Zürich 1769-1774, S. 203–207.
 Matthew Pilkington, Henry Fuseli: John Martin Vyth, or Veyth, London 1805, S. 635

1650 births
1717 deaths
People from Schaffhausen
Mythological painters
17th-century Swiss painters
18th-century Swiss painters
18th-century Swiss male artists
Swiss male painters